Agama doriae, also known commonly as the Benoue agama, Doria's agama, and the Nigeria agama, is a species of lizard in the family Agamidae. The species is endemic to Africa. There are two recognized subspecies.

Etymology
The specific name, doriae, is in honor of Italian naturalist Giacomo Doria.

Geographic range
A. doriae is found in Cameroon, Central African Republic, Eritrea, Ethiopia, Ghana, Nigeria, Sudan, and Togo.

Habitat

Description

Reproduction
A. doriae is oviparous.

Subspecies
Two subspecies are recognized as being valid, including the nominotypical subspecies.

Agama doriae benueensis 
Agama doriae doriae

References

Further reading
Boulenger GA (1885). "Description d'une espèce nouvelle d'Agame". Annali del Museo Civico di Storia Naturale di Genova, Serie Seconda 2: 127–128. (Agama doriae, new species). (in French).
Monard A (1951). "Résultants de la mission zoologique suisse au Cameroun. Reptiles ". Mémoires de l'Institut d'Afrique Noire, centre de Cameroun, série Sciences naturelles 1: 123–170. (Agama agama benueensis, new subspecies, p. 130). (in French).
Moody SM, Böhme W (1984). "Merkmalsvariation und taxonomische Stellung von Agama doriae Boulenger, 1885 und Agama benueensis Monard, 1951 (Reptilia: Agamidae) aus dem Sudangürtel Afrikas ". Bonner zoologische Beiträge 35 (1–3): 107–128. (in German, with an abstract in English).
Trape J-F, Trape S, Chirio L (2012). Lézards, crocodiles et tortues d'Afrique occidentale et du Sahara. Paris: IRD Orstom. 503 pp. . (in French).

Agama (genus)
Reptiles described in 1885
Taxa named by George Albert Boulenger